The Philippines national beach handball team is the national team of the Philippines. It takes part in international beach handball competitions and is governed by the Philippine Handball Federation.

Nicknamed the "Amigos", the men's national team was formed shortly prior to the 2017 Southeast Asian Beach Handball Championship which was hosted at home in Dumaguete. The team finished third overall but secure a win against eventual champions Vietnam. The team was coached by Joanna Franquelli.

Franqueilli later led the squad at the 2018 International Beach Handball Grand Prix in Shandong, China where the national team reached at least the semifinal and the 2019 Asian Beach Handball Championship  where the national team finished 8th place out of 12 teams in their competition debut.

They won a bronze medal at the 2019 Southeast Asian Games and a silver medal at the 2021 Southeast Asian Games.

Results

Asian Beach Handball Championship
 Champions   Runners up   Third place   Fourth place

Asian Beach Games
 Champions   Runners up   Third place   Fourth place

Southeast Asian Games
 Champions   Runners up   Third place   Fourth place

Southeast Asian Beach Handball Championship
 Champions   Runners up   Third place   Fourth place

Coach
 Joanna Franquelli (2017–)

References

National beach handball teams
Beach handball
2017 establishments in the Philippines